Andrzej Iwiński (9 April 1946 – 27 October 2020) was a Polish sailor. He competed at the 1968 Summer Olympics and the 1980 Summer Olympics.

References

External links
 

1946 births
2020 deaths
Polish male sailors (sport)
Olympic sailors of Poland
Sailors at the 1968 Summer Olympics – Flying Dutchman
Sailors at the 1980 Summer Olympics – Flying Dutchman
Sportspeople from Warsaw